Brutus Township was a township in Ingham County, Michigan from 1839 until 1841. In 1841 it was divided into Leroy Township and Wheatfield Township.

Sources

1839 establishments in Michigan
Defunct townships in Michigan